
Gmina Iwkowa is a rural gmina (administrative district) in Brzesko County, Lesser Poland Voivodeship, in southern Poland.

Villages
Gmina Iwkowa contains the villages and settlements of Dobrociesz, Drużków Pusty, Iwkowa, Kąty, Połom Mały, Porąbka Iwkowska and Wojakowa.

Neighbouring communes
Gmina Iwkowa is bordered by the gminas of Czchów, Laskowa, Lipnica Murowana and Łososina Dolna.

References
Polish official population figures 2006

Iwkowa
Brzesko County